Ray Jacobs may refer to:
 Ray Jacobs (defensive tackle) (born 1938), American football defensive tackle
 Ray Jacobs (linebacker) (born 1972), American and Canadian football linebacker
 Ray Jacobs (baseball), American infielder in Major League Baseball
 August 08 (rapper), American rapper and songwriter

See also
 Ray Jacobs Boarding School, a private school in Mgbidi, Imo State, Nigeria
 Raymond Jacobs, United States Marine Corps sergeant
 Raymond Jacobs (photographer), American photographer, filmmaker, and businessman